I Get Wet is the debut studio album by American musician Andrew W.K. It is noted for its controversial artwork as well as its hit singles "Party Hard" and "She Is Beautiful".

Recording

Production
I Get Wet was recorded while Andrew W.K. was living in New York City. The album was recorded with many layers of overdubbing, in order to make the album "sound as party as we could make it sound," and for the "sound of the songs to be like one instrument" instead of a collection of individual musicians. In July 2001, W.K. and Jimmy Coup traveled to Minneapolis, Minnesota to record with John Fields at SubJersey Studio. In August, the three traveled to Sherman Oaks, California to mix the record with Mike Shipley at Record One.

Influences
One inspiration for the album was Andrew W.K.'s enjoyment of intense, major-key music, something he attributed to his musical childhood experiences with the piano.

Another inspiration for I Get Wet was the charity single "We Are the World" by USA for Africa. Andrew W.K. was impressed with how all the artists on the song were singing all at once, something he described as a "powerful sound, like an orchestra." In turn, Andrew W.K. wanted to create music that sounded like that.

Artwork
I Get Wet is known for its cover art shot by art photographer Roe Ethridge: a photo of a wet-haired Andrew W.K. with a large stream of blood running from his nose, down his chin and onto his throat.  This cover art caused a controversy, as it was seen to represent cocaine abuse and violence. To achieve the effect, W.K. initially said that he struck himself in the face with a piece of a cinder block during the photo shoot but later explained that it did not lead to enough blood flow. Consequently, he supplemented his own blood with some of an animal which he got from a butcher's shop.

Release history
The album went to #1 on Billboards Top Heatseekers chart. The songs "Party Hard" and "She Is Beautiful" were released as singles. The opening track, "It's Time to Party", was featured in an advertisement for Hotwire.com, a Coors spot and an Expedia ad. "Fun Night" can be heard in the 2003 film Old School. The track, "Don't Stop Living in the Red" was featured in an ad for Target. "I Love NYC" is frequently played at New York Rangers games. "Ready to Die" is used in the Hitman game series, as well as the trailer for the game Rage 2.

On August 28, 2012, a deluxe reissue of I Get Wet was released. The reissue contained previously unheard recordings, demos, live tracks, and alternate mixes. A limited number of autographed deluxe editions contained a lock of Andrew's hair, a piece of his white jeans, or an autographed plane ticket from his 2012 world tour.

Critical reception

I Get Wet provoked very polarizing critical reaction when it was initially released, with Pitchforks Ian Cohen retrospectively writing that "critics of Andrew W.K. were often branded as the fun police and his fans considered fools or incurable ironists." On the review aggregate site Metacritic, the album holds a score of 64 out of 100, indicating "generally favorable reviews". Stephen Thompson of The A.V. Club described I Get Wet as "more fabulously entertaining the louder it's played" and added that "if it wipes out a generation of hard-rock crybabies along the way, fans will owe him a debt of gratitude that can never be repaid." Rob Sheffield of Rolling Stone also gave the album a positive review, stating that "there's no denying the over-the-top whomp of his music, the loudest and funniest metal you've heard in ages." David Browne, writing in Entertainment Weekly, noted that W.K. "must know how ridiculous this all sounds, but he attacks the material with such fervor that you almost believe he means every word." AllMusic's Heather Phares noted that while the album "has a certain sameness due to the frenetic beat that drives nearly every track, it's the perfect complement to W.K.'s party-centric vision", praising it as "refreshingly simple and cleverly stupid."

Adrien Begrand of PopMatters gave the album a mixed review, writing "At its best, WK’s music is a refreshing blast of skanky air on the current stale music scene, but at its worst, it’s disappointingly monotonous, unoriginal, and very, very dumb." Evan Chakroff of Stylus Magazine called it a "worthless piece of rock-product, 35 minutes of glossy, overproduced tripe", but concluded that "once these songs have pounded their way into your head, you can’t help but pay attention" and "if this is a joke, it's a brilliant one." Ryan Schreiber of Pitchfork panned the album as being "about as empty as rock music gets, right down to the tinny, digitally processed tonebank noise that passes for 'guitars.'"

Legacy
Q listed I Get Wet as one of the best 50 albums of 2001. NME included I Get Wet in their retrospective list of the best albums of 2001. Rhapsody ranked the album at number two on its "Rock's Best Albums of the Decade" list. Despite initially panning the album, Pitchfork placed I Get Wet at number 144 on their list of top 200 albums of the 2000s. Ian  Cohen of Pitchfork acknowledged his review of the album's 2012 reissue, which received a "Best New Reissue" designation, as the website's "biggest statistical mea culpa ever", writing that "whether you consider these songs to be brilliant, brilliantly dumb, or just dumb, I Get Wet is necessarily simple".

Andrew W.K. reflected on the album's initial reaction in a 2012 interview, saying: 

Track listing
All songs composed and written by Andrew W.K.

Personnel
Credits adapted from the album's liner notes.Primary musiciansAndrew W.K. – vocals, composition, synthesizer, bass guitar, production
Jimmy Coup – guitar, vocals (sweet heat)
Erik Payne – guitar
Donald Tardy – drums
Gregg Roberts – bass guitar
Frank Werner – guitarAdditional personnel'

Tony Allen – guitar, assistant engineering
Dan Burns – assistant engineering
Jeff Burns – engineering
Chris Chaney – bass guitar
Cory Churko – digital editing, programming
Mike David – bass guitar
Roe Ethridge – photography
John Fields – production, engineering
Tom Gordon – sound effects
Frank Gryner – engineering
Scott Humphrey – production
Roger Lian – digital editing, programming
Tony Miller – programming
Gary Novak – additional drums
Mike Shipley – mixing
F.T. Thomas – guitar
Robert C. Thompson – engineering
 Dave Collins - mastering
TSD – production
Frank Vierti – piano, keyboards, production
Bobby Warner – engineering
K. Williams – art direction
Lloyd "Gitsy" Willis – sound effects
Phil X – guitar

Charts

Weekly charts

Year-end charts

References

2001 debut albums
Island Records albums
Andrew W.K. albums